Lee Allan (born 13 September 1991) is a former New Zealand rugby union player who played as a loose forward for  in the ITM Cup and the  in the international Super Rugby competition.

Career

Allan made his name playing for the Otago Razorbacks in New Zealand's domestic competitions and made himself a regular in the Dunedin based side's number 7 jersey during the 2013 ITM Cup campaign. This saw him named in the Highlanders wider training squad for the 2014 Super Rugby season.

Allan announced his retirement from the game in 2017 at age 25 due to on-going concussion issues. He has since taken up a role as Otago defence coach.

References

1991 births
Living people
New Zealand rugby union players
Rugby union flankers
Otago rugby union players
Highlanders (rugby union) players
Rugby union players from Auckland
People from Takapuna